Martin Petzold (born 1955) is a German classical tenor who performs in opera and in concert. A former member of the Thomanerchor, he is particularly known for the part of the Evangelist in oratorios and Passions of Johann Sebastian Bach.

Career 

Petzold was born in Leipzig, the son of the theologian Ernst Petzold. He received his first musical education as a member of the Thomanerchor, where he was a member from 1965 to 1974, at the same time as Georg Christoph Biller. His father, his brother and later his son Jakob were also choir members.

As Petzold initially refused to join the army, the East German authorities denied him the right to study music. He served for 18 months and then studied voice from 1979 to 1985 at the University of Music and Theatre Leipzig with Eva Schubert and Bernd Siegfried Weber. He wanted to sing in an opera chorus, but while still a student was engaged as a soloist in Halberstadt and Altenburg. In 1985 he became a member of the Landestheater Halle. He appeared regularly at the Leipzig Opera from 1986, and has been a permanent member of the ensemble since 1988. He has sung the parts of David in Wagner's Die Meistersinger von Nürnberg, Pedrillo in Mozart's Die Entführung aus dem Serail, Toni in Henze's Elegie für junge Liebende, Flaut in Ein Sommernachtstraum and Iwan in Shostakovich's Die Nase, among others.

In concert, Petzold has collaborated with major orchestras and choirs, such as the Thomanerchor, the Dresdner Kreuzchor, the Monteverdi-Chor Hamburg, the Gewandhausorchester, the MDR Symphony Orchestra and the Freiburg Baroque Orchestra. A particular focus of his work is works by Johann Sebastian Bach; he has sung the part of the Evangelist in his Christmas Oratorio and Passions, conducted by Biller, Peter Schreier, Kurt Masur, Roderich Kreile, Rolf Schweizer and David Timm. Petzold also works for the preservation of German folk songs.

In teaching, Martin Petzold has worked since 2002 as a lecturer at international master classes and is also a vocal coach of the Thomanerchor. In 2001, Martin Petzold was appointed Kammersänger.

References

External links 

 
 Martin Petzold website

German operatic tenors
1955 births
Musicians from Leipzig
Living people
20th-century German  male opera singers
Voice teachers
People educated at the St. Thomas School, Leipzig
University of Music and Theatre Leipzig alumni